is a Japanese ice hockey player. He competed in the men's tournament at the 1964 Winter Olympics.

Discovery of Wakinosaurus
In 1990, Masahiro Sato in Fukuoka found the tooth of a theropod dinosaur. The same year, Yoshihiko Okazaki first reported on the find. In 1992, Okazaki named the type species, Wakinosaurus satoi. The generic name refers to the Wakino Subgroup of the Kwanmon Group, of which the Sengoku Formation is a member. The specific name honours Sato.

References

External link
 

1936 births
Living people
Japanese ice hockey players
Olympic ice hockey players of Japan
Ice hockey players at the 1964 Winter Olympics
Sportspeople from Kanagawa Prefecture